Thomas Parry may refer to:

 Thomas Parry (Comptroller of the Household) (c. 1515–1560), serving Queen Elizabeth I of England
 Thomas Parry (ambassador) (1541–1616), English MP, ambassador to France and Chancellor of the Duchy of Lancaster
 Thomas Parry (author) (1904–1985), Welsh language literary scholar and author
 Thomas Parry (Chennai merchant) (1768–1824), Welsh merchant in Chennai, India
 Thomas Parry (bishop) (1795–1870), Bishop of Barbados, 1842–1869
 Thomas Parry (Boston MP) (1818–1879), MP for Boston three times
 Thomas Gambier Parry (1816–1888), English artist and art collector
 Tom Parry (politician) (1881–1939), Welsh Liberal politician, lawyer and soldier
 Tom Parry (economist), Australian economist and public servant
 Tom Parry (footballer) (1880–1946), Oswestry United F.C. and Wales international footballer
 Tom Parry (comedian) (born 1980), member of the sketch comedy troupe Pappy's